"(Old Dogs, Children and) Watermelon Wine" is a song written and recorded by American country music artist Tom T. Hall. It was released in November 1972 as the second and final single from the album, The Storyteller. The song was Hall's third number one on the U.S. country singles chart and earned him his second nomination for the Grammy Award for Best Country Song. "(Old Dogs, Children And) Watermelon Wine" spent one week at the top and a total of thirteen weeks on the chart.  On June 1, 2014, Rolling Stone magazine ranked "(Old Dogs, Children and) Watermelon Wine" #93 in their list of the 100 greatest country songs.

Content
The song is a true account of Hall's experience at the 1972 Democratic National Convention, where he had a conversation with an old porter (janitor) at a Miami Beach hotel. The porter appraises his own life by concluding that the only worthwhile things are the three listed in the song's title.

Covers
The song has been covered by artists such as Frankie Laine--whose version changed what the bartender was watching from Ironside to Rawhide, George Burns, John Prine and Mac Wiseman, and Ferlin Husky. Alf Robertson recorded the song in 1977 in Swedish as Hundar och ungar och hembryggt äppelvin (Swedish for Dogs and children and home brewed apple wine), with new lyrics by  himself. and with the song he also scored a Svensktoppen hit for 10 weeks between 2 November 1980--18 January 1981 which included topping the chart.

Chart performance

References

External links
 Lyrics of this song
 

1972 singles
Tom T. Hall songs
Frankie Laine songs
Ferlin Husky songs
Songs written by Tom T. Hall
Song recordings produced by Jerry Kennedy
Alf Robertson songs
1972 songs
Songs about old age
Songs about dogs
Songs about children
Songs about alcohol